Cenate may refer to places in Italy:

Cenate Sopra - a commune in the province of Bergamo
Cenate Sotto - a commune in the province of Bergamo
Cenate - a frazione in the commune of Nardò in the province of Lecce